East Campus is a neighborhood of Columbia, Missouri directly east of the University of Missouri and downtown Columbia.  The area contains historic residential property as well many Greek student organizations houses. The district contains parts of Stephens College, the Boone Hospital Center's campus and the historic Lee Street Deli.  It developed between about 1895 and 1945, and includes representative examples of Tudor Revival, Colonial Revival, and Bungalow / American Craftsman style architecture.

A historic district of much of the neighborhood was listed on the National Register of Historic Places in 1996 as East Campus Neighborhood Historic District.  The district encompasses 262 contributing buildings and 5 contributing structures.

References

External links
East Campus Neighborhood Association

Historic districts on the National Register of Historic Places in Missouri
Colonial Revival architecture in Missouri
Tudor Revival architecture in Missouri
Neighborhoods in Columbia, Missouri
National Register of Historic Places in Boone County, Missouri